The 1988–89 IHL season was the 44th season of the International Hockey League, a North American minor professional league. The regular season included ten teams. The Muskegon Lumberjacks won the Turner Cup.

Regular season

Turner Cup-Playoffs

External links
 Season 1988/89 on hockeydb.com

IHL
IHL
International Hockey League (1945–2001) seasons